Kafr Nan (also spelled Kfarnan) is a village in northern Syria, administratively part of the Homs Governorate, located north of Homs. Nearby localities include Burj Qa'i to the west, Kisin to the northwest, Gharnatah to the northeast, al-Zaafaraniyah to the east, Talbiseh to the southeast, Tasnin to the south and Akrad Dayasinah to the southeast. According to the Syria Central Bureau of Statistics (CBS), Kafr Nan had a population of 3,231 in the 2004 census. Its inhabitants are predominantly Alawites.

History
In 1838, its inhabitants were recorded to be Sunni Muslims.

References

Bibliography

 

Populated places in al-Rastan District
Alawite communities in Syria